Spadellidae is a family of sagittoideans in the order Phragmophora. Spadellidae prey on plankton and commonly reside in the epipelagic zone of the ocean.

Genera
Bathyspadella Tokioka, 1939
Calispadella Casanova & Moreau, 2005
Hemispadella Casanova, 1996
Paraspadella von Salvini-Plawen, 1986
Spadella Langerhans, 1880

References

Chaetognatha
Protostome families